Kamloops was a provincial electoral district for the Legislative Assembly of British Columbia, Canada from 1903 to 2009. The provincial constituency should not be confused with the former federal electoral district of Kamloops, which encompassed a much larger area.

For other ridings named Kamloops or in the Kamloops-Shuswap-Thompson area, please see Kamloops (electoral districts).

Kamloops voted for the winning party in every election it was contested, from the riding's creation in 1903 up until its final election in 2005.

Demographics

Electoral history 

|Conservative
|Frederick John Fulton
|align="right"|517
|align="right"|51.14%
|align="right"|
|align="right"|unknown

|Liberal
|John Francis Deane
|align="right"|494
|align="right"|48.86%
|align="right"|
|align="right"|unknown
|- bgcolor="white"
!align="right" colspan=3|Total valid votes
!align="right"|1,011
!align="right"|100.00%
!align="right"|
|- bgcolor="white"
!align="right" colspan=3|Total rejected ballots
!align="right"|
!align="right"|
!align="right"|
|- bgcolor="white"
!align="right" colspan=3|Turnout
!align="right"|%
!align="right"|
!align="right"|
|}

|Conservative
|Frederick John Fulton
|align="right"|534
|align="right"|54.88%
|align="right"|
|align="right"|unknown

|Liberal
|John Donald Swanson
|align="right"|439
|align="right"|45.12%
|align="right"|
|align="right"|unknown
|- bgcolor="white"
!align="right" colspan=3|Total valid votes
!align="right"|973
!align="right"|100.00%
!align="right"|
|- bgcolor="white"
!align="right" colspan=3|Total rejected ballots
!align="right"|
!align="right"|
!align="right"|
|- bgcolor="white"
!align="right" colspan=3|Turnout
!align="right"|%
!align="right"|
!align="right"|
|}

|Conservative
|James Pearson Shaw
|align="right"|872
|align="right"|64.40%
|align="right"|
|align="right"|unknown

|Liberal
|Henry Maxwell Vasey
|align="right"|482
|align="right"|35.60%
|align="right"|
|align="right"|unknown
|- bgcolor="white"
!align="right" colspan=3|Total valid votes
!align="right"|1,354
!align="right"|100.00%
!align="right"|
|- bgcolor="white"
!align="right" colspan=3|Total rejected ballots
!align="right"|
!align="right"|
!align="right"|
|- bgcolor="white"
!align="right" colspan=3|Turnout
!align="right"|%
!align="right"|
!align="right"|
|}

|Conservative
|James Pearson Shaw
|align="right"|931
|align="right"|70.11%
|align="right"|
|align="right"|unknown

|Liberal
|Raymond Findlay Leighton
|align="right"|397
|align="right"|29.89%
|align="right"|
|align="right"|unknown
|- bgcolor="white"
!align="right" colspan=3|Total valid votes
!align="right"|1,328
!align="right"|100.00%
!align="right"|
|- bgcolor="white"
!align="right" colspan=3|Total rejected ballots
!align="right"|
!align="right"|
!align="right"|
|- bgcolor="white"
!align="right" colspan=3|Turnout
!align="right"|%
!align="right"|
!align="right"|
|}

|Liberal
|Frederick William Anderson
|align="right"|1,519
|align="right"|61.27%
|align="right"|
|align="right"|unknown

|- bgcolor="white"
!align="right" colspan=3|Total valid votes
!align="right"|2,479
!align="right"|100.00%
!align="right"|
|- bgcolor="white"
!align="right" colspan=3|Total rejected ballots
!align="right"|
!align="right"|
!align="right"|
|- bgcolor="white"
!align="right" colspan=3|Turnout
!align="right"|%
!align="right"|
!align="right"|
|}

|Liberal
|James Reginald Colley
|align="right"|1,212
|align="right"|41.38%
|align="right"|
|align="right"|unknown

|Conservative
|Edwin Arthur Meighen
|align="right"|997
|align="right"|34.04%
|align="right"|
|align="right"|unknown

|- bgcolor="white"
!align="right" colspan=3|Total valid votes
!align="right"|2,929
!align="right"|100.00%
!align="right"|
|- bgcolor="white"
!align="right" colspan=3|Total rejected ballots
!align="right"|
!align="right"|
!align="right"|
|- bgcolor="white"
!align="right" colspan=3|Turnout
!align="right"|%
!align="right"|
!align="right"|
|}

|Conservative
|John Ralph Michell
|align="right"|1,531
|align="right"|50.25%
|align="right"|
|align="right"|unknown

|Liberal
|James Reginald Colley
|align="right"|1,516
|align="right"|49.75%
|align="right"|
|align="right"|unknown
|- bgcolor="white"
!align="right" colspan=3|Total valid votes
!align="right"|3,047
!align="right"|100.00%
!align="right"|
|- bgcolor="white"
!align="right" colspan=3|Total rejected ballots
!align="right"|66
!align="right"|
!align="right"|
|- bgcolor="white"
!align="right" colspan=3|Turnout
!align="right"|%
!align="right"|
!align="right"|
|}

|Liberal
|Robert Henry Carson  1
|align="right"|1,836
|align="right"|44.76%
|align="right"|
|align="right"|unknown

|Co-operative Commonwealth Fed.
|George Richmond Williams
|align="right"|1,360
|align="right"|33.15%
|align="right"|
|align="right"|unknown

|- bgcolor="white"
!align="right" colspan=3|Total valid votes
!align="right"|4,102
!align="right"|100.00%
!align="right"|
|- bgcolor="white"
!align="right" colspan=3|Total rejected ballots
!align="right"|85
!align="right"|
!align="right"|
|- bgcolor="white"
!align="right" colspan=3|Turnout
!align="right"|%
!align="right"|
!align="right"|
|- bgcolor="white"
!align="right" colspan=7|1  Brother of Ernest Crawford Carson, Conservative MLA for Lillooet.  Both became cabinet ministers in their respective governments.  Their father, Virginian Robert Carson, came west via the Sierra Nevada passes to California and, coming north for the Fraser Canyon Gold Rush, homesteaded on Pavilion Mountain on one of BC's earliest ranches.  
|}

|Liberal
|Robert Henry Carson
|align="right"|1,786
|align="right"|38.89%
|align="right"|
|align="right"|unknown

|Conservative
|Alfred Hugh Bayne
|align="right"|1,461
|align="right"|31.82%
|align="right"|
|align="right"|unknown

|Co-operative Commonwealth Fed.
|George Faulds Stirling
|align="right"|1,345
|align="right"|29.29%
|align="right"|
|align="right"|unknown
|- bgcolor="white"
!align="right" colspan=3|Total valid votes
!align="right"|4,592
!align="right"|100.00%
!align="right"|
|- bgcolor="white"
!align="right" colspan=3|Total rejected ballots
!align="right"|47
!align="right"|
!align="right"|
|- bgcolor="white"
!align="right" colspan=3|Turnout
!align="right"|%
!align="right"|
!align="right"|
|}

|Co-operative Commonwealth Fed.
|George Richmond Williams
|align="right"|1,893
|align="right"|39.01%
|align="right"|
|align="right"|unknown

|- bgcolor="white"
!align="right" colspan=3|Total valid votes
!align="right"|4,853
!align="right"|100.00%
!align="right"|
|- bgcolor="white"
!align="right" colspan=3|Total rejected ballots
!align="right"|54
!align="right"|
!align="right"|
|- bgcolor="white"
!align="right" colspan=3|Turnout
!align="right"|%
!align="right"|
!align="right"|
|}

|Co-operative Commonwealth Fed.
|Charles Archibald Smith
|align="right"|2,751
|align="right"|35.53%
|align="right"|
|align="right"|unknown
|- bgcolor="white"
!align="right" colspan=3|Total valid votes
!align="right"|7,743
!align="right"|100.00%
!align="right"|
|- bgcolor="white"
!align="right" colspan=3|Total rejected ballots
!align="right"|105
!align="right"|
!align="right"|
|- bgcolor="white"
!align="right" colspan=3|Turnout
!align="right"|%
!align="right"|
!align="right"|
|}

|Liberal
|Thomas Palmer Wilson
|align="right"|2,017
|align="right"|24.87%
|align="right"|
|align="right"|unknown

|Co-operative Commonwealth Fed.
|Victor Mauro
|align="right"|1,144
|align="right"|14.11%
|align="right"|
|align="right"|unknown
|- bgcolor="white"
!align="right" colspan=3|Total valid votes
!align="right"|8,109
!align="right"|100.00%
!align="right"|
|- bgcolor="white"
!align="right" colspan=3|Total rejected ballots
!align="right"|53
!align="right"|
!align="right"|
|- bgcolor="white"
!align="right" colspan=3|Turnout
!align="right"|%
!align="right"|
!align="right"|
|}

|CCF
|Ronald Edmund Green
|align="right"|2,828
|align="right"|27.15%
|align="right"|
|align="right"|unknown

|Liberal
|Thomas Palmer Wilson
|align="right"|1,437
|align="right"|13.80%
|align="right"|
|align="right"|unknown

|Progressive Conservative
|Peter John Millward
|align="right"|1,374
|align="right"|13.19%
|align="right"|
|align="right"|unknown
|- bgcolor="white"
!align="right" colspan=3|Total valid votes
!align="right"|10,416
!align="right"|100.00%
!align="right"|
|- bgcolor="white"
!align="right" colspan=3|Total rejected ballots
!align="right"|531
!align="right"|
!align="right"|
|- bgcolor="white"
!align="right" colspan=3|Turnout
!align="right"|%
!align="right"|
!align="right"|
|}

|Progressive Conservative
|Edmund Davie Fulton
|align="right"|4,473
|align="right"|37.22%
|align="right"|
|align="right"|unknown

|Liberal
|Henry Maxwell Smith
|align="right"|580
|align="right"|4.83%
|align="right"|
|align="right"|unknown
|- bgcolor="white"
!align="right" colspan=3|Total valid votes
!align="right"|12,019
!align="right"|100.00%
!align="right"|
|- bgcolor="white"
!align="right" colspan=3|Total rejected ballots
!align="right"|71
!align="right"|
!align="right"|
|- bgcolor="white"
!align="right" colspan=3|Turnout
!align="right"|%
!align="right"|
!align="right"|
|}

|Liberal
|Nicholas Harvey Kalyk
|align="right"|2,000
|align="right"|18.20%
|align="right"|
|align="right"|unknown
|- bgcolor="white"
!align="right" colspan=3|Total valid votes
!align="right"|10,990
!align="right"|100.00%
!align="right"|
|- bgcolor="white"
!align="right" colspan=3|Total rejected ballots
!align="right"|63
!align="right"|
!align="right"|
|- bgcolor="white"
!align="right" colspan=3|Turnout
!align="right"|%
!align="right"|
!align="right"|
|}

|Liberal
|Malcolm Bates (Mack) Bryson 
|align="right"|4,860
|align="right"|28.96%
|align="right"|
|align="right"|unknown 
|

|- bgcolor="white"
!align="right" colspan=3|Total valid votes
!align="right"|
!align="right"|
!align="right"|
|- bgcolor="white"
!align="right" colspan=3|Total rejected ballots
!align="right"|
!align="right"|
!align="right"|
|- bgcolor="white"
!align="right" colspan=3|Turnout
!align="right"|%
!align="right"|
!align="right"|
|}

|Liberal
|George William Mercer
|align="right"|5,691
|align="right"|24.43%
|align="right"|
|align="right"|unknown

|Progressive Conservative
|John Archibald Willoughby
|align="right"|3,243
|align="right"|13.92%
|align="right"|
|align="right"|unknown

|Independent
|Terrence Andrew Shaw
|align="right"|48
|align="right"|0.21%
|align="right"|
|align="right"|unknown
|- bgcolor="white"
!align="right" colspan=3|Total valid votes
!align="right"|23,291
!align="right"|100.00%
!align="right"|
|- bgcolor="white"
!align="right" colspan=3|Total rejected ballots
!align="right"|154
!align="right"|
!align="right"|
|- bgcolor="white"
!align="right" colspan=3|Turnout
!align="right"|%
!align="right"|
!align="right"|
|}

|Liberal
|Donald Norman Carter
|align="right"|4,464
|align="right"|14.84%
|align="right"|
|align="right"|unknown
|- bgcolor="white"
!align="right" colspan=3|Total valid votes
!align="right"|30,078
!align="right"|100.00%
!align="right"|
|- bgcolor="white"
!align="right" colspan=3|Total rejected ballots
!align="right"|236
!align="right"|
!align="right"|
|- bgcolor="white"
!align="right" colspan=3|Turnout
!align="right"|%
!align="right"|
!align="right"|
|}

|Progressive Conservative
|Murray Regis Pratt
|align="right"|2,273
|align="right"|7.62%
|align="right"|
|align="right"|unknown
|- bgcolor="white"
!align="right" colspan=3|Total valid votes
!align="right"|29,824
!align="right"|100.00%
!align="right"|
|- bgcolor="white"
!align="right" colspan=3|Total rejected ballots
!align="right"|545
!align="right"|
!align="right"|
|- bgcolor="white"
!align="right" colspan=3|Turnout
!align="right"|%
!align="right"|
!align="right"|
|}

|Independent
|Andrew Lapa
|align="right"|972
|align="right"|2.63%
|align="right"|
|align="right"|unknown

|Independent
|Christopher Keith Sumner
|align="right"|259
|align="right"|0.70%
|align="right"|
|align="right"|unknown
|- bgcolor="white"
!align="right" colspan=3|Total valid votes
!align="right"|36,972
!align="right"|100.00%
!align="right"|
|- bgcolor="white"
!align="right" colspan=3|Total rejected ballots
!align="right"|356
!align="right"|
!align="right"|
|- bgcolor="white"
!align="right" colspan=3|Turnout
!align="right"|%
!align="right"|
!align="right"|
|}

|Liberal
|Norman A. Morrison
|align="right"|1,277
|align="right"|1.87%
|align="right"|
|align="right"|unknown

|Independent
|Leon Mikulin
|align="right"|282
|align="right"|0.41%
|align="right"|
|align="right"|unknown
|- bgcolor="white"
!align="right" colspan=3|Total valid votes
!align="right"|68,174
!align="right"|100.00%
!align="right"|
|- bgcolor="white"
!align="right" colspan=3|Total rejected ballots
!align="right"|1,148
!align="right"|
!align="right"|
|- bgcolor="white"
!align="right" colspan=3|Turnout
!align="right"|%
!align="right"|
!align="right"|
|- bgcolor="white"
!align="right" colspan=7|6  Seat increased to two members from one..
|- bgcolor="white"
!align="right" colspan=7|7  Later elected in the riding of Dewdney and grandson of Social Credit figure Tilly Rolston..
|}

|-

|NDP
|Arthur Charbonneau
|align="right"|8,926
|align="right"|43.67%
|align="right"|
|align="right"|$26,908
|-

|- bgcolor="white"
!align="right" colspan=3|Total Valid Votes
!align="right"|20,440
!align="right"|100.00%
!align="right"|
!align="right"|
|- bgcolor="white"
!align="right" colspan=3|Total Rejected Ballots
!align="right"|247
!align="right"|1.19%
!align="right"|
!align="right"|
|- bgcolor="white"
!align="right" colspan=3|Turnout
!align="right"|20,687
!align="right"|71.65%
!align="right"|
!align="right"|
|}

|-

|- bgcolor="white"
!align="right" colspan=3|Total Valid Votes
!align="right"|22,878
!align="right"|100.00%
!align="right"|
!align="right"|
|- bgcolor="white"
!align="right" colspan=3|Total Rejected Ballots
!align="right"|172
!align="right"|0.75%
!align="right"|
!align="right"|
|- bgcolor="white"
!align="right" colspan=3|Turnout
!align="right"|23,050
!align="right"|69.56%
!align="right"|
!align="right"|
|}

|-

|- bgcolor="white"
!align="right" colspan=3|Total Valid Votes
!align="right"|20,360
!align="right"|100.00
!align="right"|
!align="right"|
|- bgcolor="white"
!align="right" colspan=3|Total Rejected Ballots
!align="right"|174
!align="right"|0.85
!align="right"|
!align="right"|
|- bgcolor="white"
!align="right" colspan=3|Turnout
!align="right"|20,534
!align="right"|72.46
!align="right"|
!align="right"|
|}

|-

|- bgcolor="white"
!align="left" colspan=3|Total
!align="right"|23,667
!align="right"|100.00
!align="right"|
|}

Sources 
 BC Stats - 2001 (pdf)
 Results of 2001 election (pdf)
 2001 Expenditures (pdf)
 Results of 1996 election
 1996 Expenditures (pdf)
 Results of 1991 election
 1991 Expenditures
 Website of the Legislative Assembly of British Columbia
 Elections BC Historical Returns

Former provincial electoral districts of British Columbia
Kamloops